Undead in NYC is a live album by American indie rock band Gossip (under their old name The Gossip), it was released on September 9, 2003.

Track listing 
 "All This Waiting" – 2:08
 "Non Non Non" – 3:20
 "Don't (Make Waves)" – 2:41
 "Rules For Love" – 2:17
 "The Truth" – 1:54
 "Gone Tomorrow" – 2:15
 "Confessor" – 2:54
 "Arkansas Heat" – 2:16
 "Dangerr" – 2:17
 "Wanna Be Yr Dog"  – 5:00

Personnel
 Beth Ditto – vocals
 Brace Paine – guitar, bass guitar
 Kathy Mendonca – drums

References

Gossip (band) albums
2003 live albums
Dim Mak Records albums